Shakhtal Khan (also Romanized as Shākhtāl Khān) is a village in Darkhoveyn Rural District, in the Central District of Shadegan County, Khuzestan Province, Iran. At the 2006 census, its population was 1,203, in 214 families.

References 

Populated places in Shadegan County